Toyomatsu (written: 豊松) may refer to:

Toyomatsu, Hiroshima, a former village in Jinseki District, Hiroshima, Japan
, Japanese writer and Scouting pioneer

Japanese masculine given names